The Texas lieutenant gubernatorial election was held on November 2, 2010 to elect the Lieutenant Governor of Texas. Incumbent Lieutenant Governor David Dewhurst was reelected in a landslide over Linda Chavez-Thompson. Dewhurst was sworn in for a third term on January 15, 2011.

Primaries

General Election Results

References

2010
Texas
lieutenant gubernatorial